The Chakri dynasty is the current reigning dynasty of the Kingdom of Thailand, the head of the house is the king, who is head of state. The family has ruled Thailand since the founding of the Rattanakosin Era and the city of Bangkok in 1782; following the end of Taksin Thonburi's reign, when the capital of Siam shifted to Bangkok. The royal house was founded by Rama I, an Ayutthaya military leader of Sino-Mon descent.

Prior to his accession to the throne, Rama I held for years the title Chakri, the civil chancellor. In founding the dynasty, the king himself chose "Chakri" as the name for it. The emblem of the house is composed of the discus (Chakra) and the trident (Trisula), the celestial weapons of gods Vishnu and Shiva, of whom the Thai sovereign is seen as an incarnation.

The current head of the house is Maha Vajiralongkorn who was proclaimed king on 1 December 2016, but has reigned with retroactive effect since 13 October 2016 after the death of his father Bhumibol Adulyadej. The house's current seat is the Grand Palace. On Saturday, 4 May 2019, the coronation of Vajiralongkorn, with the traditional ceremony, occurred in Bangkok.

Royal family 

The present royal family of Thailand is descended from Prince Mahidol Adulyadej of Songkla (1891–1929) and Srinagarindra (later Princess Mother) (1900–95) forming the House of Mahidol (ราชสกุลมหิดล) (a cadet branch of the dynasty). The Prince was a son of King Chulalongkorn and his wife Queen Savang Vadhana. The Prince was also the half-brother of both King Vajiravudh and King Prajadhipok. After the death of King Ananda Mahidol (Prince Mahidol's elder son), King Bhumibol Adulyadej (the Prince's younger son) ascended the throne in 1946. In 1949 the King married his first cousin once removed, Mom Rajawongse Sirikit Kitiyakara (a daughter of Mom Chao Nakkhatra Mangala Kitiyakara, a grandson of King Chulalongkorn). Bhumibol was succeeded by his son Maha Vajiralongkorn officially on 13 October 2016, but was proclaimed King on 1 December 2016.

Members
This is a list of current members of the royal family:

 Queen Sirikit, the Queen Mother (the King's mother, the late King Rama IX's consort)
 King Vajiralongkorn (Phra Vajira Klao Chao Yu Hua)
 Queen Suthida (the King's consort)
 Princess Bajrakitiyabha, the Princess Rajasarini Siribajra (the King's older daughter)
 Princess Sirivannavari Nariratana (the King's younger daughter)
 Prince Dipangkorn Rasmijoti (the King's fifth and youngest son and heir presumptive to the throne of Thailand)
 Princess Sirindhorn, the Princess Debaratana Rajasuda (second daughter of King Rama IX)
 Princess Chulabhorn, the Princess Srisavangavadhana (youngest daughter of King Rama IX)
 Princess Siribha Chudabhorn (Princess Chulabhorn's older daughter)
 Princess Aditayadorn Kitikhun (Princess Chulabhorn's younger daughter)
 Princess Ubolratana Rajakanya (oldest daughter of King Rama IX)

Other members
 Princess Soamsawali, the Princess Suddhanarinatha (the King's former consort and mother of Princess Bajrakitiyabha, the Princess Rajasarini Siribajra)
 Chao Khun Phra Sineenat Bilaskalayani (the King's concubine/royal noble consort)
 Sujarinee Vivacharawongse (the King's former consort and mother of Princess Sirivannavari) 
 Juthavachara Vivacharawongse (the King's oldest son) and his wife, Riya Gough
 Vacharaesorn Vivacharawongse (the King's second son)
 Chakriwat Vivacharawongse (the King's third son)
 Vatcharawee Vivacharawongse (the King's fourth son)
 Than Phu Ying Srirasmi Suwadee (the King's former consort and mother of Prince Dipangkorn Rasmijoti) 
 Than Phu Ying Ploypailin Jensen (Princess Ubolratana's elder daughter) and her husband, David Wheeler
 Maximus Wheeler (Princess Ubolratana's oldest grandchild)
 Leonardo Wheeler (Princess Ubolratana's second grandchild)
 Alexandra Wheeler (Princess Ubolratana's third grandchild)
 Than Phu Ying Sirikitiya Jensen (Princess Ubolratana's younger daughter)
 Than Phu Ying Dhasanawalaya Sornsongkram (the King's first cousin, daughter of the late Princess Galyani Vadhana) and her husband, Sinthu Sornsongkram
 Jitat Sornsongkram (grandson of the late Princess Galyani Vadhana) and his wife, Jessica Sornsongkram

Line of succession 

 King Mongkut (1804–1868)
 King Chulalongkorn (1853–1910)
 King Vajiravudh (1881–1925)
 King Prajadhipok (1893–1941)
Mahidol Adulyadej, Prince Father (1892–1929)
 King Ananda Mahidol (1925–1946)
  King Bhumibol Adulyadej (1927–2016)
 King Vajiralongkorn (born 1952)
 (1) Prince Dipangkorn Rasmijoti (b. 2005)
 (–) Juthavachara Vivacharawongse (b. 1979)
 (–) Vacharaesorn Vivacharawongse (b. 1981)
 (–) Chakriwat Vivacharawongse (b. 1983)
 (–) Vatchrawee Vivacharawongse (b. 1985)
 (2) Bajrakitiyabha, Princess Rajasarinisiribajra (b. 1978)
 (3) Princess Sirivannavari (b. 1987)
 (–) Princess Ubolratana (b. 1951)
 (4) Sirindhorn, Princess Debaratanarajasuda, Princess Royal (b. 1955)
 (5) Chulabhorn, Princess Srisavangavadhana (b. 1957)
Yugala Dighambara, Prince of Lopburi (1882–1932)
Prince Bhanubandhu Yugala (1910–1995)
 (6) Prince Nawaphan Yugala (b. 1978)
Prince Chaloemphonthikhamphon (1913–1991)

(7) Prince Chaloemsuek Yugala (b. 1950)
(8) Prince Thikhamphon Yugala (b. 1951)
Prince Anusorn Mongkolkarn (1915–1998)
(9) Prince Chatrichalerm Yugala (b. 1942)
(10) Prince Chulcherm Yugala (b. 1947)
Chaiyanuchit, Prince Phongsadisonmahip (1861–1936)
(11) Prince Charunritthidet Jayankura (b. 1933)
Svasti Sobhana, Prince Svastivatana Visishtha (1865–1935)
(12) Prince Pusan Svastivatana (b. 1929)

Notes
 Princess Ubolratana Rajakanya (b. 1951), eldest daughter of King Rama IX, renounced her right of succession for herself and her heirs upon her marriage in 1972.
 Juthavachara Vivacharawongse (b. 1979), Vacharaesorn Vivacharawongse (b. 1981), Chakriwat Vivacharawongse (b. 1983), and Vatchrawee Vivacharawongse (b. 1985), the sons of King Rama X and Sujarinee Vivacharawongse, are not in the line of succession to the throne.

History

Monarchs

Timeline

Front Palaces

The Maha Uparat (มหาอุปราช) or the Krom Phrarajawang Bavorn Sathan Mongkol (Vice or Second King of Siam/Viceroy of Siam) (กรมพระราชวังบวรสถานมงคล) was an office that was bestowed on the highest ranking prince, frequently the monarch's younger brother or son. Until 1885 every Chakri monarch had appointed a prince to this office. The Uprarat and his miniature court would reside at the Front Palace (วังหน้า) (a palace complex to the north of the Grand Palace, now the site of the Bangkok National Museum). By tradition the Uparat was designated the heir to the throne, however only Prince Isarasundhorn was able to ascend the throne as King Buddha Loetla Nabhalai. The office was extremely prestigious and carried with it almost equal status to the king, this can be seen in Prince Chutamani (younger brother of King Mongkut), who was elevated to Vice King Pinklao in 1851 (he carried with him the styles and titles of a King). The office was abolished by King Chulalongkorn when his Uparat and cousin Prince Bovorn Vichaicharn died. He then declared his oldest son the crown prince of Siam, but not Uparat.

Rear Palace
Krom Phrarajawang Boworn Sathan Phimuk (กรมพระราชวังบวรสถานพิมุข), or the Rear Palace, was another office inherited from the Kingdom of Ayutthaya. However, since the founding of the dynasty there has only been one rear palace. Prince Anurak Devesh was the nephew of King Buddha Yodfa Chualoke (his mother Princess Thepsuthavadi was the king's elder sister) and was appointed to the office in 1785.

Crown Princes

The Crown Prince of Thailand or Sayam Makutrajakuman (สยามมกุฎราชกุมาร) is the designated and heir apparent to the throne and headship of the dynasty. The title was created in 1886 when King Chulalongkorn appointed his eldest son by Princess Consort Savang Vadhana, Prince Vajirunhis as Sayam Makutrajakuman. The title was copied directly from the Western tradition. Since then, there has only been three crown princes. The most recent crown prince, Maha Vajiralongkorn, was invested with the title in 1972 and became King in 2016. The succession is governed by the 1924 Palace Law of Succession passed by King Vajiravudh.

Queens

Family tree

Cadet houses

Royal houses

Viceregal houses

See also

 Monarchy of Thailand
 List of monarchs of Thailand
 List of Thai royal consorts
 Rattanakosin era
 1924 Palace Law on Succession
 Rama (King of Thailand)
 Order of the Royal House of Chakri
 Privy Council of Thailand
 Regent of Thailand

References

External links 

 Chakri Dynasty and the City of Angels
 The Chakri Dynasty 1782
 The Siamese Royalty
 The Royal Houses of the Chakri Dynasty
 History of the Front Palaces

 
Royal family
Thai monarchy
Thai royalty
1780s in Siam
1790s in Siam
19th century in Siam
20th century in Thailand
21st century in Thailand
1782 establishments in Siam